Canada has participated in every Commonwealth Games since the first ever British Empire Games held in Hamilton, Ontario in 1930, one of only six countries to have done so. The others are Australia, England, New Zealand, Scotland, and Wales.

History 
Newfoundland competed separately at the 1930 and 1934 Games (although not winning any medals), but since 1950 has competed as part of Canada.

The Canadian team won 54 medals in the first (1930) Games, and 51 gold medals at Edinburgh (1986). Canada's biggest total medal tally was 129 medals in Victoria (1994).

Canada came third in the medal count at the 2006 Commonwealth Games in Melbourne after Australia and England, and is third on the all-time medal tally of Commonwealth Games, with an overall total of 1318 medals (413 Gold, 443 Silver and 462 Bronze). Canada was top of the medal tally once, at the 1978 games at Edmonton, Alberta

Canada has hosted the games four times. The first Games were at Hamilton, Ontario in 1930. Vancouver hosted the 1954 British Empire and Commonwealth Games notable for the famous "miracle mile" (four-minute mile) between Roger Bannister of England and John Landy of Australia at Empire Stadium. Edmonton was the first city to host the Commonwealth Games under that name in 1978, and Victoria, British Columbia hosted the Games in 1994.

Montreal was set to host the games in 1942 but they were cancelled due to the Second World War. Canada was offered to host them in 1950 but declined.

Hamilton applied to host the 2010 Commonwealth Games but lost to the Delhi bid. Halifax, Nova Scotia withdrew its bid for the 2014 Commonwealth Games.

The Commonwealth Games Association in Canada, known as Commonwealth Sport Canada (CSC) is responsible for organizing the Canadian team participating in the Commonwealth Games.

Medals

See also

Canadian medals by Game :
 Canada at the 1930 British Empire Games
 Canada at the 1950 British Empire Games
 Canada at the 1958 British Empire Games
 Canada at the 1982 Commonwealth Games
 Canada at the 2006 Commonwealth Games

References

 
Nations at the Commonwealth Games